Joseph Jean-Baptiste Édouard Pierre "Pete" Bellefeuille (October 16, 1900 – July 14, 1970), nicknamed "The Fleeting Frenchman", was a Canadian professional ice hockey right winger who played 5 seasons in the National Hockey League for the Toronto St. Pats, Toronto Maple Leafs, and Detroit Cougars between 1925 and 1930. In 1963, Bellefeuille was coaching a hockey team in Trois-Rivieres.

Career statistics

Regular season and playoffs

References

External links
 

1900 births
1970 deaths
Canadian ice hockey right wingers
Detroit Cougars players
Detroit Olympics (CPHL) players
Detroit Olympics (IHL) players
French Quebecers
Ice hockey people from Quebec
London Panthers players
Ontario Hockey Association Senior A League (1890–1979) players
Quebec Castors players
Seattle Eskimos players
Sportspeople from Trois-Rivières
Syracuse Stars (IHL) players
Toronto Maple Leafs players
Toronto St. Pats players